Guaranteed Rate Companies is a U.S. residential mortgage company headquartered in Chicago, Illinois. Founded in 2000 by Victor Ciardelli, the company had $73 billion in funded volume in 2020. As of 2021, the company has more than 10,000 employees and more than 850 offices nationwide and is located in 50 states.

History 

Guaranteed Rate was founded in Chicago in 2000 by Victor F Ciardelli III, a native of Oak Brook, Illinois, who now resides in a $38 million Miami Beach mansion purchased in May 2021, serves as chairman and CEO. Through 2020, the company is the third largest retail mortgage lender in the US.

Guaranteed Rate has been named to the Chicago Tribune'''s Top Workplaces list every year from 2012 through 2018. In 2013, Guaranteed Rate was listed by Crain's Chicago Business as one of the fastest growing companies in Chicago. The company was listed by U.S. News & World Report in 2018 as Top Lender for Online Service. Shant Banosian of Guaranteed Rate in Massachusetts ranked number 1 in the Scotsman Guide 2018 Top Originators rankings, and again in 2019 and 2020. In 2020, Banosian also became Guaranteed Rate's first loan officer to originate over $1 billion in total loan volume in a year, followed a few months later by Ben Cohen. Risha Kilaru of Guaranteed Rate in California ranked number 1 in the Scotsman Guide 2018 and 2019 Top Women Originators rankings.

Guaranteed Rate Foundation was formed in 2012 to help those in need through difficult times. As of June 2021, the foundation has donated over $5 million in charitable grants.

In 2013, Guaranteed Rate grew to more than $15.9 billion in residential home loans, an increase of $1.2 billion over 2012. This moved the company from the 12th-largest retail mortgage lender in the U.S. to the 10th.

In February 2014, Guaranteed Rate launched its first national ad campaign, featuring American television host Ty Pennington. The company budgeted up to $10 million for the campaign, growing to as much as $15 million in 2015. A 2016 Guaranteed Rate Super Bowl commercial featuring Pennington aired in regional markets.

In 2015, Guaranteed Rate became the 8th largest retail mortgage lender with volume of more than $18 billion in home loans and was named Lender of the Year by Chicago Agent magazine.

In March 2016, Guaranteed Rate and one of its loan officers were found guilty in California of diverting loans from Mount Olympus Mortgage, and ordered to pay $25 million in damages to the Irvine, California-based company. In May, Guaranteed Rate bought the URL Rate.com for $725,000. In August, the Chicago White Sox announced a 13-year agreement with Guaranteed Rate to rename their stadium to Guaranteed Rate Field beginning November 1, 2016. At the time, the Chicago Sun-Times wrote, "There can't be a worse name than Guaranteed Rate Field. Can't be." 

In 2017 the team and Guaranteed Rate teamed up to create the Guaranteed Impact program, which honors kids who make a positive difference in their community. Also in 2017, Guaranteed Rate entered into a joint venture with Realogy Holdings Corp to form Guaranteed Rate Affinity. Guaranteed Rate will provide marketing services to Realogy's subsidiaries, including NRT and Cartus, and will take over some assets of its former joint venture partner, PHH Mortgage out of New Jersey. In December, Guaranteed Rate announced plans to sell a minority stake of the company to an affiliate of Boston-based private equity firm Thomas H. Lee Partners. The partial sale was finalized in June 2018. Also in December, a former loan officer sued Guaranteed Rate claiming that he was owed $2 million and that executives at the company were manipulating and misreporting financial information for their own benefit. 

In January 2018, Guaranteed Rate announced that its employees' and customers' personal information was in hackers' hands as the result of an email phishing attack. In October, Guaranteed Rate is one of the seven-largest retail mortgage provider in the US.  

In January 2019, The Wall Street Journal revealed Guaranteed Rate's and other firms' efforts to boost their Glassdoor ratings. According to the article, the company "pressured employees to write positive reviews in order to raise poor ratings, according to interviews with current and former employees." Prior to these efforts, the company's rating on Glassdoor averaged 2.6 out of 5. As of August 3, 2022, the company is rated 2.9 out of 5 on Glassdoor.com, continuing its steady decline from 2019. 

In October, Guaranteed Rate partnered with online notary company  Notarize to launch a product allowing homebuyers to complete the entire closing process online. The company also announced a partnership with Marcus by Goldman Sachs to help customers consolidate debt and fund home improvement projects. In 2019, Guaranteed Rate launched a market research platform for potential home buyers to research neighborhood property trends, home prices, demographics, income levels, and school districts.

In April 2020, Guaranteed Rate was required to pay the federal government a $15 million fine to settle a lawsuit brought by a former employee whistleblower who alleged the company pushed its underwriters into endorsing ineligible loans for FHA and VA loan programs and making false statements to "induce the government" to extend insurance coverage. According to the Chicago Tribune, as part of the settlement, Guaranteed Rate admitted that it failed to adhere to self-reporting requirements and certified loans for government insurance that were not eligible. It also admitted to giving FHA underwriters commissions and gifts in violation of the rules. 

In July, Guaranteed Rate and @Properties launched the joint venture Proper Rate, a Chicago-based independent retail mortgage lender that will serve as an in-house lender for @Properties. In August 2020, the company signed a 12-race sponsorship deal with Roush Fenway Racing, to fund Ryan Newman's car through the remainder of the 2020 NASCAR season. They also sponsored Spanish racing driver Álex Palou. In October, the company became the title sponsor of a college football bowl game played at Chase Field in Phoenix, Arizona. The bowl has used several names since 2015, being branded as the Cactus Bowl and then the Cheez-It Bowl before being rebranded as the Guaranteed Rate Bowl. Along with most other third-tier bowl games, the 2020 game was canceled due to the COVID-19 pandemic. The Guaranteed Rate Bowl will return after a year off on December 28, 2021, pairing teams from the Big 12 and Big Ten.  Also in 2020, the company partnered with the National Hockey League, US Figure Skating, and World TeamTennis as their official mortgage partner. They also sponsored US Figure Skating's National Get Up Day on February 1, 2021. During 2020, Guaranteed Rate originated over 135,000 mortgages with a value of over $47,000,000,000.

On January 22, 2021, the company was announced as the title sponsor of the 2021 Professional Bowlers Association Tour. Guaranteed Rate ran a 60-second spot during the Super Bowl LV broadcast on February 7, 2021, featuring mixed martial artist Dustin Poirier, stock car racing driver Ryan Newman, and Erik Weihenmayer, the first blind man to climb to the top of Mount Everest.

Acquisitions and layoffs
In 2012, Guaranteed Rate acquired Manhattan Mortgage, a residential mortgage brokerage in the New York Metropolitan Area. Founded in 1985 by Melissa L. Cohn, the company employed more than 100 home loan professionals and originated loans in New York, Vermont, Massachusetts, Connecticut, Florida and New Jersey. Cohn later sued Guaranteed Rate and CEO Victor Ciardelli for breach of contract and fraud among other complaints but was unsuccessful. Also in 2012, Guaranteed Rate acquired Massachusetts-based Superior Mortgage. 

In 2014, Guaranteed Rate acquired Sun State Home Loans, Nationwide Direct, and Arbor Mortgage in one deal. It also acquired lender FirsTrust Mortgage in Overland Park, Kansas. In November 2018, Guaranteed Rate announced that it would acquire some assets of Honolulu HomeLoans and its affiliate Hawaii Lending Alliance, in order to expand further into the state.

In January 2021, Guaranteed Rate acquired Stearns Holdings, to help the company expand its joint ventures. In February 2021, the company acquired assets of Owning Corporation, a direct-to-consumer mortgage lender. In March 2021, after acquiring AI Foundry of Kodak Alaris, the company launched the mortgage tech company Gateless, which utilizes artificial intelligence and machine learning technologies.

In January 2022, Guaranteed Rate closed Stearns Lending after owning it for one year, laying off 348 employees. 

Awards and accolades
Guaranteed Rate recognized as one of the most successful private companies in the U.S. for a fifth consecutive year by Inc. MagazineGuaranteed Rate named a top private U.S. job creator by Inc. MagazineGuaranteed Rate ranked as a top workplace by the Chicago Tribune in 2012, 2013, 2014, 2015, 2016, 2017, 2018
Guaranteed Rate was named Top Lender by Chicago Agent Magazine from 2016-2020
Founder and CEO, Victor Ciardelli, III was named an Ernst & Young Entrepreneur of the Year Award winner in 2012
American Business Award for digital mortgage technology in 2016
 Top Lender for Online Service, U.S. News & World Report'', 2018

References

External links
 

Mortgage lenders of the United States
Companies based in Chicago
Financial services companies established in 2000
2000 establishments in Illinois